Serere is a town in Eastern Uganda. It is the chief political, administrative and commercial town in Serere District, and the district headquarters are located there. The district is named after the town.

Location
Serere lies in Serere District, Teso sub-region, in Uganda's Eastern Region. The coordinates of Serere are:1°30'00.0"N, 33°33'00.0"E (Latitude:1.5000; Longitude:33.5500).

Population
, the exact population of Serere is not known.

Points of interest
The following points of interest are found in Serere:

 The headquarters of Serere District Administration
 The offices of Serere Town Council
 Serere Central Market
 Serere Agricultural Research Station - An agricultural research institute administered by the Uganda Ministry of Agriculture
 Serere Township Secondary School

See also
Serere District
Teso sub-region
Eastern Region, Uganda

References

External links
  Serere Township Secondary School Homepage

Populated places in Eastern Region, Uganda
Cities in the Great Rift Valley
Serere District